KESA (100.9 FM) is an adult contemporary radio station licensed to Eureka Springs, Arkansas, United States. The station is currently owned by Jay Bunyard, through licensee Carroll County Broadcasting, Inc.

References

External links

ESA
Mainstream adult contemporary radio stations in the United States